The president of the Malaysian Friendship and Trade Centre is the head of Malaysia's diplomatic mission to the Republic of China (Taiwan). The position has the rank and status of an Ambassador Extraordinary and Plenipotentiary and is based in the Malaysian Friendship and Trade Centre, Taipei.

List of heads of mission

Presidents of the Malaysian Friendship and Trade Centre

See also
 Malaysia–Taiwan relations

References 

 
Taiwan
Malaysia